Horoatu Crasnei is a commune located in Sălaj County, Crișana, Romania.

Villages
The commune is composed of four villages: Horoatu Crasnei, Hurez (Bagolyfalu), Stârciu (Bogdánháza) and Șeredeiu (Sereden).

Stârciu
Stârciu is a village in Horoatu Crasnei commune.

In 1910, the village had 1,505 inhabitants: 1,453 Romanians and 25 Hungarians. The first historical accounts of the village was in 1341. Until 1919 the village was part of the Kingdom of Hungary's Szilágy; it was again part of Hungary during World War II (1940 to 1944).

Sights 
 Reformed Church in Horoatu Crasnei, built in the 15th century, historic monument
 Orthodox Church in Horoatu Crasnei, built in the 18th century

References

External links
 Administrative map of the county
 2002 population figures
 Map of the county

Communes in Sălaj County
Localities in Crișana